Broido is a surname. Notable people with the surname include:

Daniel Broido (1903–1990), Russian British engineer
Eva Broido (1876 or 1878–1941),  Russian revolutionary, Secretary of the Central Committee of the Menshevik Party
Lucie Brock-Broido (1956–2018), American author of four collections of poetry
Vera Broido (1907–2004), Russian-born writer and a chronicler of the Russian Revolution